Shanti - Ek Aurat Ki Kahani is an Indian television series that aired on DD National in 1994. The series stars Mandira Bedi as Shanti.

Plot
Every character has a past and has something hidden, it all gets revealed when Shanti, an aspiring journalist hoping to write the biographies of Kamesh and Raj, arrives. The duo they only approve of a movie when it is appreciated by the servants of the house and tell of how they went from rags to riches.

Then are shown the family members, Kamesh's eldest son Ramesh is mentally challenged. Younger son Somesh is a failing director struggling over the script which gets rejected even by his own father. His wife Ayesha is the daughter of a film producer whose career was ruined by the duo. His adopted daughter Nidhi was revealed to be the illegitimate daughter of Kamesh. Raj's wife took to Ashrams and Sadhus, while his youngest son Nihal returns with an American white friend Michelle, who accidentally revealed that she is his wife. His elder daughter Maya is drawn to depression by her mother's absence, while his womanizer  elder son Rohan is forced to marry a model Sasha after she threatens to come out to the press.

All this is witnessed by Shanti who too has a dark past because one of them is her biological father. Shanti's mother was a laborer working during the construction of Shanti Mansion who was raped by both Kamesh and Raj.

Cast
 Mandira Bedi as Shanti 
Mohini Sharma as Tulsi 
 Rajesh Tailang as Manu
 Amit Behl as Vijay
 Anup Soni as Shekhar 
 Yatin Karyekar as Kamesh Mahadevan
 Jyotsna Karyekar as Maa
 Vijay Aidasani as Somesh Mahadevan
 Sumukhi Pendse as Ayesha Mahadevan
 Iravati Harshe as Nidhi Mahadevan 
 Richa Ahuja as Nidhi Mahadevan
 Aman Verma as Sanjay 
 Amar Talwar as Raj 'G.J.' Singh
 Anita Kanwal as Indu Singh
 Sanjeev Kapadia as Nihaal
 Sukanya Kulkarni as Maya
 Salim Fatehi Rohan Singh
 Jitu Shastri as Ramesh Mahadevan
 Amikev Singh as Sasha
 Ashwini Kalsekar as Sasha
 Sunil Shende as Bhandari/Bhai
 Rajesh Jais as Nanu

References

External links

DD National original programming
1994 Indian television series debuts
UTV Television
Indian television soap operas
1998 Indian television series endings
Bollywood in fiction